Murder in Greenwich is a 2002 American television film directed by Tom McLoughlin. The teleplay by Dave Erickson is based on the 1998 book of the same title by Mark Fuhrman.

The Columbia TriStar Domestic Television production debuted on the USA Network on November 15, 2002, and was released on DVD on May 6, 2003.

Plot
The film is narrated by Martha Moxley (Maggie Grace), whose brutal murder sometime between 10 p.m. on October 30 and the early morning hours of October 31, 1975, remains unsolved in 1997. Mark Fuhrman, a former Los Angeles Police Department detective who gained notoriety during the O. J. Simpson's murder trial, is intrigued by the case and travels to Greenwich, Connecticut, to conduct an investigation of his own. Local authorities resent an outsider, especially one with a reputation as tarnished as Fuhrman's, invading their turf. They do everything they can to block Fuhrman's access to official reports. The film alternates between flashbacks of the events leading up to the murder and scenes set in the present day, which chronicle Fuhrman's frustration and interactions with Steve Carroll, the original investigator who grudgingly assists him. Their efforts ultimately bring Kennedy relative and former Moxley neighbor Michael Skakel to justice.

Cast
 Christopher Meloni as Mark Fuhrman
 Robert Forster as Steve Carroll
 Maggie Grace as Martha Moxley
 Jon Foster as Michael Skakel
 Toby Moore as Thomas Skakel
 Liddy Holloway as Dorothy Moxley

Critical reception
Michael Speier of Variety said, "Investigative techniques give way to genre cliches in USA's exaggerated Murder in Greenwich. Falling into the telepic trap of sensationalism without savvy, [it] delves into the shallow end of the Martha Moxley-Michael Skakel case, which has plenty more politics, intrigue and confounding history than this execution suggests . . . As Fuhrman, Meloni is macho almost to the point of bogus; whether he's playing the disgraced cop as he really is or how he thinks America sees him is hard to discern."

Robert Pardi of TV Guide awarded the film two out of four stars and observed, "Despite the assured teamwork of Meloni and Forster, Tom McLoughlin's film . . . fails to build upon its inherently suspenseful elements or extract much juice from the gossipy Kennedy allure. But viewers with little prior knowledge of the case may find themselves caught up in this dismaying tale of justice delayed."

References

External links

2002 films
2002 television films
American docudrama films
Films scored by Don Davis (composer)
Films based on non-fiction books
Films directed by Tom McLoughlin
Films set in 1975
Films set in 1997
Films set in Connecticut
USA Network original films
USA Network original programming
American drama television films
2000s American films